Teresa Suárez Cosío (born May 15, 1989), commonly known by her stage name Teri Gender Bender, is an American singer and musician, known primarily as the founding member, lead singer, and guitarist of Guadalajara-based rock band Le Butcherettes since 2007. With Omar Rodríguez-López, she is a member of Bosnian Rainbows (founded in 2012), Crystal Fairy (founded in 2016) and Kimono Kult.  Her performance persona and artistry have been compared to Björk, Siouxsie Sioux, and Karen O.

Biography 
Suárez was born in Denver to a Mexican mother and a Spanish father, who worked as a prison steward.  At age ten she began to have recurring dreams of playing guitar, and was able to convince her father to buy her one. She lived in Denver for the first thirteen years of her life, until she moved to Mexico with her mother and two younger brothers after her father's death from a heart attack.

Suárez and drummer Auryn Jolene founded Le Butcherettes at age 17 while still in school in Guadalajara. Jolene was later replaced by Normandi Heuxdaflo.  The band incorporated graphic elements such as raw meat and bloody aprons into their stage performances and Suárez adopted the last name Gender Bender as feminist statements of the treatment of women in Mexico. Suárez met Omar Rodríguez-López at one of their local gigs. He was impressed by her performance when after a power outage had interrupted the show, she jumped into the crowd and continued singing into a megaphone. Rodríguez-López signed the band to his label, went on to produce their first album Sin Sin Sin in 2011, and also briefly served as the band's bassist. Suárez contributed lyrics and vocals to Rodríguez-López' Octopus Kool Aid in 2012, and starred in his unreleased film project Mi No Y Esperanza. Le Butcherettes' 2014 album Cry Is for the Flies was written about her experience moving from her family in Mexico to Los Angeles in 2012.

In February 2016, she released a cover of Depeche Mode's "I Feel You", recorded together with Omar Rodríguez-López and With Lions, and made available via the latter's SoundCloud account.

Suárez is a vegetarian. She used to be a vegan but stated that she developed anemia which motivated her dietary change.

Discography
Bosnian Rainbows
 Bosnian Rainbows Live At Clouds Hill LP (2012)
 Bosnian Rainbows LP (2013)
 TBA LP (TBA)
Le Butcherettes
 Kiss & Kill EP (2008)
 Sin Sin Sin  LP (2011)
 iTunes Live: SXSW EP (2011)
 Cry Is for the Flies LP (2014)
 A Raw Youth LP (2015)
 Chaos As Usual (With Melvins) [vinyl split] Single (2015)
 Sólo Soy Pueblo (Llanto) Single (2015)
 Shave the Pride Single (2015)
 House Hunter Single (2016)
 My Mother Holds My Only Life Line Single (2016)
 bi/MENTAL LP (2019)
 Ever Fallen In Love (With Someone You Shouldn't've) Single (2019)
 DON'T BLEED LP (2020)
Omar Rodríguez-López
 Octopus Kool Aid LP (2012)
 Hiding In The Light EP (2014) as Kimono Kult
 Sworn Virgins LP (2016)
 Corazones LP (2016)
 Blind Worms Pious Swine LP (2016)
 Arañas en la Sombra LP (2016)
 Umbrella Mistress LP (2016)
 El Bien y Mal Nos Une LP (2016)
 Cell Phone Bikini LP (2016)
 Infinity Drips LP (2016)
 Weekly Mansions LP (2016)
 Zapopan LP (2016)
 Some Need It Lonely LP (2016)
 A Lovejoy (2016)
 Zen Thrills (2017)
 Chocolate Tumor Hormone Parade (2017)
 Azul, Mis Dientes (2017)
 Doom Patrol (2017)
Crystal Fairy
 Necklace of Divorce / Drugs on the Bus Single (2016)
 Crystal Fairy LP (2017)
Teri Gender Bender
 Insect Legs (from Unspeakable Volume One compilation) (2014)
 Rebel Girl (Melvins feat. Teri Gender Bender) Single (2015)
 I Feel You (with With Lions and Omar Rodríguez-López) (2016)
 cuando yo era una nina (2022)
 ''olivia, she wanted me to leave her alone (2022)
 madre would not allow it though (2022)
 pestering became a virtue (2022)
 leaving her to be was just not an option (2022)
 erik, even he found it to be obscene (2022)
 x rays were taken to make sure i am there, that i existed (2022)

References

Living people
Mexican rock musicians
1989 births
American emigrants to Mexico
Musicians from Denver
Mexican people of Spanish descent
Guitarists from Colorado
21st-century Mexican singers
21st-century American guitarists
Crystal Fairy (band) members
Bosnian Rainbows members
Le Butcherettes members
Women in punk
21st-century American singers
Non-binary musicians